Johannes Ruysch (c. 1460? in Utrecht – 1533 in Cologne), a.k.a. Johann Ruijsch or Giovanni Ruisch was an explorer, cartographer, astronomer, manuscript illustrator and painter from the Low Countries who produced a famous map of the world: the second oldest known printed representation of the New World. This Ruysch map was published and widely distributed in 1507.

Biography

In old documents, Ruysch was sometimes called a Fleming or German, but he was likely born in Utrecht in the current Netherlands. It is thought (see the Beneventanus commentary below) that he accompanied John Cabot on his expedition to North America in 1497 and 1498, or, considering the prevalence of Portuguese names on his 1507 map, a Portuguese ship leaving from Bristol. Around 1505, Ruysch probably entered the Benedictine monastery of St. Martin in Cologne as a secular priest. Soon he left for Rome, where pope Julius II gave him a dispensation concerning his priestly occupation. He presumably made his world map there in 1507, appears on payrolls in 1508 and 1509 and seems to have specialized in decorative painting. He is thought to be the “Fleming called John”, a close friend of Raphael who at one point resided with him. It has been suggested that he assisted and advised Raphael on his 1509-1510 “Astronomia” and other frescoes in the Stanza della segnatura. Not long after, Ruysch went to work at the Portuguese court as cartographer and astronomer, presumably by recommendation of Julius II who was friends with Manuel I of Portugal. Later, he returned to the St. Martin monastery, suffering from consumption, but able to create a, now lost, astronomical wall painting illustrating the days, months (phases of the Moon), and constellations. He is said to have died at considerable age in 1533 at the monastery, where he had a room adjacent to the library.

Age of discovery
There had been many voyages of discovery immediately before Ruysch created his map :
 Dias’ rounding of the horn of Africa (1487)
 the rediscovery of Newfoundland by John Cabot (1497) (rediscovery, as the Norse had been to Newfoundland centuries before and settled there)
 Vasco da Gama’s travel to India (1499)
 the explorations of the Caribbean and South America by Columbus (1492–93, 1493–94, 1498, 1502-04)
 visits to the Caribbean and South America by Vespucci (1499, 1501–02)

Although there had been maps created after these voyages, such as Juan de la Cosa’s map of the world in 1500 (based on Columbus' second voyage) and the Cantino world map (circa 1502), the information on these maps was closely held and guarded as state secrets. Often a limited number of copies were made.

Publicizing the shape of the world
This situation changed drastically from 1506 to 1507 when three separate efforts to produce world maps were published. The Contarini-Rosselli map of 1506 (now in the British Library) and Martin Waldseemüller's map of the world and globe of 1507 were very influential, but not very widely published. There is only one original copy of each in existence, and both of these copies were discovered in the 20th century. By contrast, Johannes Ruysch's 1507 map of the world was much more widely published and many copies were produced and still exist. It therefore had a very large influence.

The Ruysch Map of 1507

Ruysch's 1507 map of the world was included in the 1507 and 1508 southern editions of Ptolemy's Geographia, an atlas published in Rome. The editor of the 1507 edition of the Geographia was Evangelista Tosinus and the printer was Bernardinus Venetus de Vitalibus.

The Ruysch map uses Ptolemy's first projection, a coniform projection, as does the Contarini-Rosselli map. Both document Christopher Columbus' discoveries as well as the discoveries of John Cabot, as well as including information from Portuguese sources and Marco Polo's account of his travels.  There are notes on his map that clearly were from Portuguese sources.

Newfoundland is shown connected to Asia in the Ruysch map, as Cabot believed. The presence of codfish is noted on the Ruysch map in the area of the Grand Banks of Newfoundland.

Greenland is shown connected to Newfoundland and Asia on Ruysch's map, and not Europe as earlier maps had showed. Around the north pole, Ruysch drew islands, based on reports in the book Inventio Fortunata of the English friar Nicholas of Lynne. The island above Norway shows remarkable similarities to Svalbard, which would not be discovered until 1597 (by Willem Barents).  Ruysch calls it 'European Hyberborea' and a peninsula stretching out towards it is clearly marked with the church of 'Sancti Odulfi', St Olaf's church in Vardø on the Finnmark coast.

Ruysch's map contains the discoveries the Portuguese had made along the African coast. Ruysch's map shows Africa as a peninsula surrounded by water. The horn of Africa on Ruysch's map is at approximately the correct latitude. Ruysch's map shows India as a triangular peninsula with Ceylon in the correct proportion and position.

Ruysch's map has details about Asia based on data gathered by travelers like Marco Polo, as well as Greco-Roman authorities. Unaware of the existence of the Pacific Ocean he, like Christopher Columbus, saw Central and North America as the eastern part of Asia. He accepted that Sipango [Japan] and Hispaniola [Haiti] were one and the same, a concept he expressed in the legend he inscribed on his world map: Marco Polo says that 1500 miles to the east of the port of ZAITON (Quanzhou) there is a very large island called SIPANGO whose inhabitants are idolaters: they have their own king and pay tribute to none. Here there is a great amount of gold and gems of all kinds. But as the islands discovered by Spanish ships occupy this place, we do not dare to put this island here, believing what the Spaniards call SPAGNOLA  to be SIPANGO, for everything that is written of Sipango is found in Spagnola except for the idolatry.

Map commentary
There was a map commentary also included in the 1508 edition, entitled  and written by an Italian Celestinian monk named Marcus Beneventanus. Beneventanus, wrote in the commentary on the Ruysch map for the 1508 Ptolemy edition: 
Johannes Ruysch of Germany, in my judgment a most exact geographer, and a most painstaking one in delineating the globe, to whose aid in this little work I am indebted, has told me that he sailed from the South of England, and penetrated as far as the fifty-third degree of north latitude, and on that parallel he sailed west toward the shores of the East, bearing a little northward and observed many islands.

Commentary:
The church "Sancti Odulfi" shown on Ruysch's map, is not the church in Vardø, Finnmark, but the cathedral in Trondheim. It is placed exactly where Trondheim is supposed to be on the map. This cathedral is the very Saint Olaf Cathedral, as it was built upon his grave.
The church in Vardø was constructed in AD 1307 and was the first church in Finnmark. So, it was in place long before Ruysch made his map, and to be true, no one knows from what saint it was named.
Neither is it any reason for thinking that the island above Norway is meant to be Svalbard. It has no remarkable similarity to Svalbard, and in fact there are four similar islands. Then it is more probable that this feature of the map is inspired by the Inventio Fortunatae, or from the fact that the old cartographers wanted the landmasses to be in balance.

References
 Donald L. McGuirk Jr. (1989) Ruysch World Map: Census and Commentary,Imago Mundi, 41:1, 133-141

External links

 Ruysch 1506 map showing Africa and India 
 Ruysch 1506 map of the world showing North America and South America 
 The Mapping of America, Seymour I. Schwartz, Ralph E. Ehrenberg, Abrams, New York, 1980.
 The New World in Maps: The First Hundred Years, John T. Day (St. Olaf College), The Newberry Library, 1988. 
 Wikisource:Catholic Encyclopedia (1913)/John Ruysch

1460s births
1533 deaths
16th-century Dutch astronomers
16th-century Dutch cartographers
Scientists from Utrecht (city)
Catholic clergy scientists
16th-century Dutch explorers
16th-century Dutch writers